VTM Kids (formerly known as VTMKzoom) was a Belgian commercial television channel for youth. The broadcasts of the channel began on 1 October 2009. VTM Kids targeted children. The children's channel was owned by DPG Media (formerly Medialaan).

The channel was available in analog and digital basic offer of Telenet and in the digital basic offer of Proximus TV and TV Vlaanderen.

History 

Since 15 February 2015, children's programmes have been broadcast on VTM in the morning again. Initially only on weekends, but since 3 July 2017 every day. Since 2 October 2017, the morning block is called VTM Kids. The block broadcasts repeats of vtmKzoom and Kadet.

On 22 December 2018 vtmKzoom and Kadet were replaced by the channels VTM Kids and VTM Kids Jr. Most of the programmes of vtmKzoom and Kadet were moved to VTM Kids. The toddler and pre-school programmes from vtmKzoom were moved to VTM Kids Jr.

On 22 January 2020, DPG Media announced that VTM Kids Jr. would be merged with VTM Kids into a single channel. On 2 March 2020, VTM Kids Jr. was replaced by CAZ 2. 

On 9 January 2023, VTM Kids ceased broadcasting as a linear channel. The programs still broadcast during the VTM Kids program block in the morning on VTM and remain available via VTM GO.

The VTM Kids linear channel was replaced by VTM Non-Stop Dokters, on 9 January 2023.

Programming
Most programs that are broadcast on VTM Kids are from the Flemish production companies Studio 100, Seamonster and Sultan Sushi. This list is incomplete.

Flemish children shows
Booh
De Wereld van K3
Kabouter Plop
My Name is Michael
The Voice Kids
vtmKzoom Hitlist
vtmKzoom Pop
vtmKzoom Pop Artiest

Imported children shows
All Hail King Julien
Annedroids
Atomic Puppet
Bakugan: Battle Planet
Bananas in Pyjamas
Bannertail: The Story of Gray Squirrel
Bob the Builder
Calimero
Cavegirl
Danger Mouse
Dinotrux
DreamWorks Dragons
Fantasy Patrol
Fireman Sam
G.I. Joe: Renegades
Harry & Bunnie
Harry and His Bucket Full of Dinosaurs
Heidi
Heidi, Girl of the Alps
Home: Adventures with Tip & Oh
Hot Wheels Battle Force 5
Kick Buttowski: Suburban Daredevil
Kitty Is Not a Cat
Lassie
Littlest Pet Shop
Lost in Oz
Martin Morning
Maya the Bee
Meteor and the Mighty Monster Trucks
Miffy's Adventures Big and Small
My Little Pony: Friendship Is Magic
Odd Squad
Pingu
Pippi Longstocking
Pokémon
Polly Pocket
Pound Puppies
Sally Bollywood
Simsala Grimm
Sunny Bunnies
Talking Tom and Friends
Teletubbies
Spirit Riding Free
The Amazing Spiez!
The Adventures of Puss in Boots
The Busy World of Richard Scarry
The Epic Tales of Captain Underpants
The Spooktacular New Adventures of Casper
The Wild Adventures of Blinky Bill
Thomas & Friends
Transformers: Cyberverse
Vicky the Viking
Wendy
YooHoo and Friends
Zigby

VTMKzoom+
VTMKzoom+ was a digital addition to VTMKzoom which broadcast 24/24. The channel was accessible via the red button on the remote control of the digital TV.

The pay channel was available from 1 October 2009 via Telenet Digital TV, 24h/24. From 23 September 2013 the channel was no longer included in the new paying packages of Telenet. Only customers who were still subscribed to the old "kids package" can watch it.

The channel closed down on 1 June 2016.

References

External links
 Official website
 DPG Media

Children's television networks
Television channels in Flanders
Television channels in Belgium
Defunct television channels in Belgium
Television channels and stations established in 2009
Television channels and stations disestablished in 2023
2009 establishments in Belgium
2023 disestablishments in Belgium
Vilvoorde